Robert Brodie Clark CBE (born 16 June 1951) is a British civil servant who was head of the UK Border Force, a part of the UK Border Agency, until his resignation in November 2011.

Career

HM Prison Service
Brodie Clark started his career in Her Majesty's Prison Service in 1973 as assistant governor HM Borstal Wetherby, from 1977 to 1981 he was at Acklington prison and from 1981 to 1994 had appointments as governor at Gartree, Bedford prisons and in 1992 he successfully commissioned, opened and governed the New Generation Prison at Milton Keynes, Woodhill prison.

In 1994 he was appointed governor to the troubled Whitemoor top security jail. Later that year, six prisoners including Paul Magee and other IRA members, escaped from the prison's Special Secure Unit. All were immediately recaptured. Clark and his top team led the security upgrade at Whitemoor, which set the template for security procedures, practice and technologies across the High Security Prison Estate.

In 1999, he was appointed as the Director of High Security Prisons, the 10 Top Security Prisons in England and Wales and from 2000 to 2003 he held the post of Director of Security for the Prison Service. He led a major programme in tightening security arrangements across the prison estate and he made a significant contribution to the reduction of suicides across the prison system.

UK Border Agency
Following some well publicised problems within the Immigration Detention Estate – which culminated in the devastating fire at the Yarl's Wood Immigration Removal Centre in February 2002, Clark moved from the Prison Service to join the Immigration and Nationality Department of the Home Office (now UKBA) in 2003 to manage the Detention estate and the Accommodation Centre Programme. A year later he was appointed to head up the UK Immigration Service, whilst retaining his Detention Centre responsibilities. During this period he successfully led the work on the Ministerial target of 'Tipping the Balance' which saw the removal of failed asylum seekers exceed the new monthly stock; he consolidated the border control operation in Northern France (detecting and preventing some 25,000 individuals from making (in some cases repeated) clandestine attempts to reach the UK in 2009 alone) and he built important international links to enhance the global reach of the UK's border control efforts.

In April 2008 he was appointed as the Head of UK Border Control and in 2009, following the 'Security in a Global Hub' Review he was charged with the responsibility of integrating the front line border customs operation (HMRC) with the border Immigration operation, thus delivering a more effective policing capability against illegal activity spanning people and goods. By 2010 the 9000 strong multiskilled Border Force was in place.

He was appointed a CBE in the 2010 New Year Honours for his contribution to border security.

In 2010, with Ministerial approval, he began to introduce a more risk-based approach to delivering improved front line detection – partly to increase the efficiency of the overall operation, partly to manage and mitigate the impact of an £85m running cost reduction and partly to line up more effectively with other policing operational approaches.

Suspension and resignation
In summer 2011, the Home Office gave permission for the UK Border Force to introduce a more risk based approach relating to persons entering the United Kingdom on European passports, to ensure a better and more effective use of resources. This procedure was then extended to non-EU citizens, a move which Home Secretary Theresa May said had been undertaken without her knowledge. The Home Secretary made a statement to the House on 7 November 2011 setting out the causes for concern as follows:

First, biometric checks on EEA nationals and Warnings Index checks on EEA national children were abandoned on a regular basis, without ministerial approval.
Biometric checks on non-EEA nationals were also thought to have been abandoned on occasions, without ministerial approval.
Second, adults were not checked against the Warnings Index at Calais, without ministerial approval.
Third, the verification of the fingerprints of non-EEA nationals from countries that require a visa was stopped, without ministerial approval.

The Home Office suspended Clark, and carried out a precautionary suspension for two of Clark's senior team: Carole Upshall, director of the Border Force South and Europe, and Graeme Kyle, director of operations at Heathrow Airport. The BBC reported that staff may have been told not to scan biometric passports at certain times. These contain a digital image of the holder's face which can be used to compare with the printed version and check the passport has not been forged. It is also believed that "warning index checks" at Heathrow Airport and the port of Calais, which would have applied strict security checks against official watchlists of terrorists, criminals, and deported illegal immigrants were also suspended.

Three investigations were subsequently commissioned:
One by Dave Wood, ex-Metropolitan Police detective, the UKBA's head of enforcement and crime group. This was a two-week inquiry designed to discover to what extent checks were scaled down, and what the security implications might have been.
One by Mike Anderson, an ex-MI6 official, director general of the strategy, immigration and international group at the Home Office. This was to investigate wider issues relating to the performance of UKBA.
It was announced on 5 November 2011 by Theresa May that an independent inquiry would also be undertaken, led by the Chief Inspector of the UK Border Agency, John Vine. Mr Vine completed his report on 7 February 2012 and it was published on 20 February 2012.

In the event, the Anderson enquiry did not proceed. An additional and separate 'leak enquiry' was also commissioned into the circumstances around damaging and critical information and misinformation reaching the press about Clark and, separately, a draft of the Woods enquiry allegedly being provided to the press.

The Vine Report was a public document, published in February 2012 – highlighting the need for a more effective operating mandate between Ministers and officials; flagging up poor record keeping within the Border Force and requiring Ministers to be clearer on their requirements in respect of standards, policy and decisions.

Neither the Wood Report nor the leak enquiry have been published and the Home Office has been rigorous in refusing to declare the findings.

On 8 November 2011 Clark formally resigned from the UK Border Agency insisting that comments made by the Home Secretary, Theresa May amounted to constructive dismissal and that he would launch legal proceedings.

In mid-March 2012, it was reported that Mr Clark had reached an out-of-court settlement with the Home Office, avoiding the need for both parties to go to an Employment Tribunal. It was also reported that under the settlement, neither Mr Clark nor the Home Office admitted any liability or wrongdoing, and that the amount of the settlement would not be disclosed. It was further reported that while the sum of money paid to Mr Clark to settle the case was undisclosed, and that while the settlement might save time and legal costs for the Government, it also meant that the full account of what had happened – which had led to the UK Border Agency's being split in two – might never be disclosed.

On 12 July 2012, a note on page 33 of the UK Border Agency's Annual Report and Accounts 2011–2012 made the following declaration: "Mr Clark resigned on 8 November 2011. A settlement payment of £225,000 was subsequently made without an admission of liability or wrongdoing from either side. The costs associated with Mr Clark are included within the accounts of the Home Office along with the other costs of Border Force, which became a directorate of the Home Office on 1 March".

On 26 July 2012, BBC News reported Keith Vaz, chairman of the Home Affairs Committee, as saying in hindsight that Mr Clark's departure had been "totally unnecessary" and had happened because "everyone panicked". Mr Vaz (in an apparent vindication of Mr Clark's risk-based approach to checks and queue management) was further reported as saying that "the home secretary's decision to suspend the risk-based approach was wrong ... I think we need to leave it to experienced officers to decide whether or not they need to check everybody 100%".

Home Affairs Committee
The Home Affairs Committee took evidence from several of the people involved in the matter of Brodie Clark's suspension:
8 November 2011 – Rt Hon Theresa May MP, Home Secretary
15 November 2011 – Brodie Clark, former Head of the Border Force and Rob Whiteman, Chief Executive, UKBA
22 November 2011 – Damian Green MP, Immigration Minister and Dame Helen Ghosh DCB, Permanent Secretary, Home Office
8 December 2011 – Jonathan Sedgwick, acting Chief Executive, UKBA, in charge after Lin Homer left to become Permanent Secretary at the Department for Transport and before the appointment of Rob Whiteman. On the same day, the Committee published some written evidence submitted by Brodie Clark.

On 19 January 2012, the Committee published its report, Inquiry into the provision of UK Border Controls. The main burden of its findings was that the Committee could reach no reasoned conclusions because, despite first promising to do so, the Home Office eventually refused to make relevant information available to the Committee (para.27):

... we would normally expect a Government of any party to acquiesce to such a request from a Select Committee. We recommend that the Home Secretary deposit copies of all the documents that have been made available to the three internal investigations in the Library of this House. This will allow this Committee to reach an informed conclusion of our own and would be consistent with the Government's commitment to transparency and accountability ...

References

1951 births
Living people
British civil servants
British prison governors
Commanders of the Order of the British Empire